Barishal

India
 Bhandaria, Bhavnagar, a village in Bhavnagar Taluka of Bhavnagar district, Gujarat
 Bhandaria State, a former Kamaliya Rajput princely state with seat in the above town
 Bhandaria, Garhwa (Hindi: भंडरिया), a taluka (administrative block) of Garhwa district, Jharkhand

Pirojpur Bangladesh 
 Bhandaria, Bengal, a town in Pirojpur District of Barisal Division 
 Bhandaria Government College, a state university in the above town 
 Bhandaria Upazila (Bengali: ভাণ্ডারিয়া), an Upazila of Pirojpur District, Division of Barisal
 Bhandaria, Pirojpur, Barisal

See also 
 Bandāra